Galtabäcks BK is a Swedish football club located in Tvååker.

Background
Galtabäcks BK currently plays in Division 4 Halland which is the sixth tier of Swedish football. They play their home matches at the Galtabäcks IP in Tvååker.

The club is affiliated to Hallands Fotbollförbund. Galtabäcks BK played in the 2011 Svenska Cupen but lost 0–9 at home to Alingsås IF in the preliminary round.

Season to season

Footnotes

External links
 Galtabäcks BK – Official website

Football clubs in Halland County
1930 establishments in Sweden